Mariano Acosta may refer to

 Mariano Acosta (politician) (1825–1893), Vice President of Argentina 
 Mariano Acosta (athlete) (born 1930), Argentinian sprinter
 Mariano Acosta, Buenos Aires Province, a city in Argentina
 Mariano Acosta (Buenos Aires Premetro), a railway station